Shovel Knight is a platform video game developed and published by Yacht Club Games. Development was crowdfunded and the game was released for Nintendo 3DS, Wii U, and Windows in June 2014. It was ported to OS X and Linux in September 2014, PlayStation 3, PlayStation 4, PlayStation Vita, and Xbox One in April 2015, Amazon Fire TV in September 2015, and Nintendo Switch in March 2017. Shovel Knight is inspired by gameplay and graphics of platformer games developed for the Nintendo Entertainment System.

The game received critical acclaim, with critics considering it one of the greatest video games ever made. With the release of additional campaigns, the original story received the retronym Shovel of Hope. The full game was released in December 2019 as Shovel Knight: Treasure Trove, which includes three other campaigns Plague of Shadows, Specter of Torment, and King of Cards, along with multiplayer fighting game Shovel Knight Showdown.

A spin-off dungeon crawler puzzle game, Shovel Knight Pocket Dungeon, was co-developed with Vine and released on December 13, 2021 for macOS, Windows, Nintendo Switch, and PlayStation 4. Another spin-off, the roguelike Shovel Knight Dig, was co-developed with Nitrome and released on September 23, 2022 for Windows, Nintendo Switch, and Apple Arcade.

Gameplay

Shovel of Hope 
Shovel Knight is a 2D side-scrolling platform game with an 8-bit graphical style. In the game's first campaign, Shovel of Hope, players control the eponymous protagonist as he collects treasure and fights against the Order of No Quarter. Shovel Knight's primary means of attack is his shovel, which he can either use to attack enemies head-on and dig up treasure, or aim below him while jumping to bounce on enemies, similar to the pogo jump from DuckTales or the downward thrust from Zelda II: The Adventure of Link. By finding a salesman named Chester hidden in most levels, the player can purchase secondary items known as relics that can be used with a limited supply of magic. These include long-range projectiles, gloves that can punch through dirt blocks, and a locket that makes the player invincible for a brief period.

Aside from the main quest, which involves fighting through each level and defeating the boss at the end in order to progress through the world map, players are encouraged to collect as much treasure as possible. Treasure can be obtained by defeating enemies, finding chests, digging through the environment, and finding note sheets that also unlock music tracks. Any money earned can be spent in villages on various items, such as upgrades to health and magic, secondary items sold by the salesman, and armor and shovel upgrades that grant bonus skills. While the player does have infinite lives, dying will cause the player to lose some of their money, though the player can recover it by collecting the flying sacks that appear around where the player last died. For an added challenge, players can also choose to destroy checkpoints to earn more treasure at the risk of being sent back further should they die.

Completing the game opens up a New Game Plus mode, which increases the overall difficulty of the game by doubling the damage Shovel Knight takes, as well as limiting the number of checkpoints in a stage, though the player retains any relics and health and magic upgrades collected during their first playthrough. There is also a password system allowing players to input codes to unlock various cheats.

Downloadable content
Free downloadable content (DLC) updates add new features to the game, such as additional challenges, co-op modes, and a Body Swap mode allowing players to alter the genders of certain characters. Three additional single-player campaigns titled Plague of Shadows, Specter of Torment, and King of Cards each focus on different playable characters, along with multiplayer expansion Shovel Knight Showdown. These are either included as part of the Treasure Trove edition or can be purchased separately and are free for Kickstarter contributors. The single-player campaigns are available on all platforms whereas Showdown is not available on the 3DS or Vita versions due to their handheld nature.

Plague of Shadows casts players as Plague Knight, who uses bombs to both attack enemies and launch himself through the air. Players can unlock and customize types of powder, casing, and fuses to alter how their bombs behave. Specter of Torment puts players in control of Specter Knight, who can run up walls and use his scythe to slash diagonally through enemies and obstacles to reach new areas. Unlike Shovel of Hope, Specter Knight's campaign does not feature a world map. Finally, King of Cards puts players in control of King Knight, who has a shoulder bash which turns into a spin attack upon colliding with enemies or walls. Levels are shorter, and only some contain bosses. The campaign features a card battle mini-game called "Joustus", in which players must tactically place cards on a field to claim spaces marked with gems. Much like Shovel Knight's items, each campaign has a unique set of items for their respective characters, and hidden collectibles to unlock upgrades.

Shovel Knight Showdown is a competitive fighting game in which up to four players face against each other in various match types, including depleting each other's health or collecting the most gems within a time limit. It features 20 playable characters, 30 battle arenas, multiple battle types, and a single-player story mode.

Version-exclusive features
Some gameplay features are unique to specific versions of the game. Both the Nintendo 3DS and Wii U versions allow players to use touch screens to switch between secondary items without pausing the game. The 3DS version features an exclusive mode known as StreetPass Arena. This involves the player recording a short section of movement, with the goal of collecting as many gems as possible, which is then distributed to other players via StreetPass, where they can fight against that player's recorded character. The Wii U, 3DS, and Nintendo Switch versions are compatible with Shovel Knight series Amiibo figures, which unlock additional challenge stages and customizable gear, as well as fairies that can accompany the player during gameplay. The Shovel Knight Amiibo figure also originally unlocked co-operative multiplayer in the Wii U version, but this feature was later added to all versions except the 3DS and PlayStation Vita versions. The PlayStation 4, Vita, Xbox One, and PC versions of the game feature exclusive boss battles; Kratos from God of War appears in the PS4 and Vita versions while Rare's Battletoads appear in the Xbox One and PC versions.

Plot

Shovel of Hope campaign
Prior to the game, adventurers Shovel Knight and Shield Knight journeyed across the world alongside one another, but while exploring the Tower of Fate, an amulet curses Shield Knight and leaves Shovel Knight stranded outside of the sealed tower. Grieving for his friend, Shovel Knight gives up adventuring and goes into self-imposed exile. During his absence, a powerful being known as the Enchantress rises to power, spreading evil across the land. Upon hearing that the Enchantress has unsealed the Tower of Fate, Shovel Knight begins his journey back to it, hoping to find and rescue Shield Knight. In order to do so, Shovel Knight must fight the members of the Order of No Quarter, a group of knights serving the Enchantress.

While journeying towards the Tower of Fate, Shovel Knight continuously battles with his old rival Black Knight. After Black Knight is defeated for a final time at the outskirts of the tower, he reveals that the Enchantress is actually Shield Knight, who is possessed by an evil spirit that inhabits the amulet. Shovel Knight ascends the tower and defeats the Order of No Quarter again, before battling the Enchantress. He manages to exorcise the evil spirit, turning her back into Shield Knight. The amulet transforms into a powerful monster known as the Remnant of Fate, which Shovel Knight and Shield Knight defeat together. Shield Knight holds back the Remnant of Fate as the tower collapses, while Black Knight carries an unconscious Shovel Knight to safety. He leaves Shovel Knight by his campfire and departs. A post-credits scene shows Shield Knight, who managed to escape the collapsing tower, lying next to Shovel Knight as he sleeps.

Plague of Shadows campaign
Running parallel to Shovel of Hope, Plague Knight, a member of the Order of No Quarter, plots his own scheme. He plans to steal essence from Shovel Knight and the other Order members to use as ingredients in the ultimate potion, capable of granting any of its user’s desires. He is aided by his alchemists and a witch named Mona, who all pursue alchemy in secret due to the rest of the world fearing and rejecting it. Plague Knight defeats the other members of the Order of No Quarter as well as Shovel Knight, and gathers the essences into his alchemical machine. While collecting the essences, Mona and Plague Knight are revealed to harbor romantic feelings for each other. Plague Knight later witnesses Mona and Black Knight talking, only for Mona to leave, mistakenly believing that she is only a tool for Plague Knight's schemes.

Once Plague Knight gathers all of the knights' essences, he journeys to the Tower of Fate for the Enchantress' essence. Plague Knight again defeats the Order of No Quarter as well as Shovel Knight, but is knocked off the tower by the latter while celebrating his victory. As Plague Knight reaches the Enchantress’ chamber and finishes the potion with her essence, Black Knight and Mona arrive and try to stop him. Plague Knight reveals that his intention was always to use the potion to win Mona's heart, but she confesses she already loves him. Plague Knight attempts to stop the reaction, but it goes out of control, creating a dark version of himself. The real Plague Knight defeats the shadow and stabilizes the potion; Mona and Plague Knight decide to use it to destroy the Tower of Fate. The villagers learn of the tower's destruction, and hail Plague Knight and his alchemists as heroes. In a post-credits scene, Plague Knight and Mona are seen sharing a dance together in their laboratory.

Specter of Torment campaign
Before the events of Shovel of Hope, the Enchantress' undead servant Specter Knight is sent to recruit eight knights to join the Order of No Quarter. The Enchantress gives Specter Knight a magical locket, which grows in power as he defeats the knights. Once all the knights are defeated, its magic will resurrect him as a living being. As Specter Knight defeats the knights and forces them to join the Order, he recalls memories of his former life; Before dying, he was an adventurer named Donovan, who explored alongside his partner, Luan. The two scaled the Tower of Fate in search of a magical amulet to give to Luan's son. Once at the top, they ran into Shield Knight, who warned them that the amulet was cursed. Donovan fought Shield Knight against Luan's wishes, causing the floor beneath them to collapse and killing Luan. Shield Knight, now transformed into the Enchantress, offered to save a mortally wounded Donovan in exchange for servitude. Oblivious to the identity of the Enchantress, he accepted the offer, and was transformed into Specter Knight.

After Specter Knight assembles half of the Order, a boy named Reize breaks into the Tower of Fate with the hope of defeating the evil within. Seeing his potential, the Enchantress fills him with dark energy, corrupting him despite Specter Knight's protests. Once seven knights have been recruited, Black Knight breaks in and reveals that the Enchantress is Shield Knight. Enraged that he has been working for his enemy, Specter Knight goes after the Enchantress through the hole that Black Knight dug into the tower. Upon his arrival, the Enchantress summons Reize and fills him with more dark energy, turning him into a powerful monster. Specter Knight defeats Reize, but the Enchantress nonetheless intends to transform him into her eighth knight. Specter Knight abruptly promises to be the last knight in Reize's place, heals the boy with his locket, and returns him to his village. With the Order of No Quarter fully assembled, Specter Knight laments to Black Knight that the Enchantress is unstoppable. In a post-credits scene, Specter Knight reminisces over the locket, which is a keepsake given to him by Luan. In a final memory, it is shown that Luan asked Donovan to protect his son, Reize.

King of Cards campaign
Prior to the events of Shovel of Hope and Specter of Torment, a card game called Joustus becomes popular across the world, with a tournament offering the title of "King of Cards" to whoever can defeat the three Joustus Judges. King Knight, wanting the title of king, receives a deck of cards from Specter Knight and begins to work his way through the tournament. King Knight's victories attract the attention of a bard and an airship captain named Cooper, who both seek a Joustus champion. With Cooper's airship, King Knight travels to Pridemoor Keep to battle the first judge, King Pridemoor, gaining supporters along the way. However, due to the rules simply saying that the Joustus judges had to be defeated, King Knight defeats King Pridemoor in battle instead of using cards. 

As King Knight searches for the next judge, he battles various future members of the Order of No Quarter. King Knight's mother starts showing romantic interest in King Pridemoor, which disgusts King Knight. He defeats the second judge, the Troupple King, before continuing on towards the last. On the outskirts of the final judge's lair, King Knight witnesses a conversation between Specter Knight and two hooded figures. After beating Specter Knight, King Knight finally makes it to the last judge, King Birder, who is revealed to be one of the hooded figures. After King Birder is defeated, he is revealed to have been controlled by the Enchantress, the other hooded figure. She tells King Knight of her plans for world domination. With the help of all of the supporters he gained along his journey, King Knight defeats the Enchantress as well as a monster she creates using the three judges. King Knight is swayed by an offer from the Enchantress to be Pridemoor's "true" king, and turns on his allies to join the Order of No Quarter. King Knight ends the Joustus contest and usurps Pridemoor's throne, with King Pridemoor and his mother abandoning him. In a post-credits scene, King Knight finishes renovations of Pridemoor Keep, and remarks to himself that he is finally able to enjoy his kingdom. Shovel Knight enters moments later, and both prepare for battle.

Shovel Knight Showdown story mode
During the events of Specter of Torment, as Specter Knight journeys to defeat the Enchantress, the inhabitants of the Tower of Fate decide to help Specter Knight. They attempt to trap the Enchantress inside her magic mirror, but accidentally also trap Shovel Knight, the members of the Order of No Quarter, and many others. Inside the mirror, the characters do battle with each other until they each find the corrupted Mirror of Fate. After each character defeats the Mirror of Fate, they are sent back to the moment of time before their imprisonment, with each character experiencing their own unique ending.

Development
Designer Nick Wozniak stated that the idea for the game started out as "sort of as a joke conversation over lunch that kind of got too serious". The team had already planned to make a game in the style of the NES classics that they grew up on, and eventually the sword-thrust move from Zelda II: The Adventure of Link was brought up as a move that both designers liked. They soon thought that this move would be better suited in their game for a shovel instead of a sword. Other specific inspirations include Castlevania III: Dracula's Curse, DuckTales, Super Mario Bros. 3, the Mega Man series, U.N. Squadron, and Dark Souls. The decision of the character's name was "pretty much settled" after the first brainstorming session, with the name "Plummet Knight" being the only other suggestion.

Those goals include a four-player battle mode, a mission-based challenge mode, an additional mode that swaps all the characters' genders, and additional playable story campaigns for three boss characters. To promote the Kickstarter, Yacht Club distributed copies of its initial Penny Arcade Expo demo to several prominent gaming personalities on YouTube, including Two Best Friends Play and Game Grumps.

Shovel Knight features a chiptune soundtrack in the style of older video games from the NES era and were composed by Jake Kaufman, with two contributions by Mega Man composer Manami Matsumae. The game's soundtrack was released for download via Bandcamp on the same day as the game, as was a rearrangement album.

Shovel Knights graphics and music mimic the style of video games from the NES era and shares the NES's limits of color palette (plus four colors) and sprite count. This means that larger sprites are superimposed on a black background to limit the onscreen colors to a realistic maximum. Other trickery to properly honor the NES limitations include camera shakes that only act on a single axis and a GUI that acts as a background layer instead of being overlaid on top of the gameplay.

Release
The game was originally slated for release in September 2013, but was delayed into early 2014. After various further delays, Yacht Club Games announced on June 5 that the game would be released on June 26, 2014. The game was eventually released on several additional platforms including both the PlayStation 4 and Xbox One, featuring exclusive boss battles, with Kratos from God of War on PS4 and the Battletoads on Xbox One. Various platforms got a physical media release in October 2015.

Prior to 2017, the game was sold with the name Shovel Knight, with various additional campaigns appearing as free downloadable content. An update in April 2017 made the original story campaign and additional downloadable campaigns available for standalone purchase on certain platforms, with the original campaign being subtitled Shovel of Hope. A compilation containing all three campaigns was released as Shovel Knight: Treasure Trove, with all previous purchases being updated to the Treasure Trove edition.

Reception

Shovel Knight received universal acclaim, according to review aggregator Metacritic. IGN editor Colin Moriarty awarded the game a 9/10 rating, calling it "arguably the best game released so far in 2014." Infendo.com called it "a brilliant homage to a bygone era, yet an equally fresh, captivating and innovative game" and Nintendo Life praised the 3DS version's "excellent controls, gorgeous graphics, an incredible soundtrack and endearing characters ... top-notch level design, varied gameplay, hidden rooms, optional challenges and a deceptively rich combat system."

Including Kickstarter backers, 180,000 copies of Shovel Knight were sold within one month of the North American launch. 49,000 copies were sold on Wii U, 59,000 were sold on 3DS, and 66,000 were sold on Steam. By December 4, 2014, more than 300,000 copies had been sold across all platforms. As of June 30, 2015, more than 700,000 copies had been sold. By December 14, 2016, 1.5 million copies had been sold. Yacht Club Games revealed in April 2018 that 2 million copies of Shovel Knight: Treasure Trove had been sold. By September 2019, 2.65 million copies had been sold.

Accolades

Legacy
An Amiibo figure of Shovel Knight was released in 2015, as the first Amiibo toy produced by a third party. An Amiibo 3-pack containing Plague Knight, Specter Knight, and King Knight was released in 2019.

Shovel Knight appears as a playable guest character in several games including Indie Pogo, Blade Strangers, Cook, Serve, Delicious: Battle Kitchen, Move or Die, Dino-Run DX, Runner3, Riverbond, Rivals of Aether, Blaster Master Zero, Bloodstained: Ritual of the Night, Road Redemption, Epic Manager, C-Wars, Starr Mazer, Runbow, All-Stars Dungeons and Diamonds, Ghost Police, Mutant Mudds Super Challenge, Pixel Noir, and Mighty Quest. Shovel Knight characters make cameo appearances in Brawlhalla,  Super Smash Bros. Ultimate, Azure Striker Gunvolt 2, Two Brothers, Yooka-Laylee, Aegis Defenders, The Reward: Tales of Alethrion, River City Ransom: Underground, Creepy Castle, Puzzle Depot, Crypt of the NecroDancer, Enter the Gungeon, Katana Zero, and For Honor. Its music appears in Just Shapes & Beats and Voez. Shovel Knight collaborated with Arby's in March 2021 to release a set of toys, which included Arby's themed cheat codes for the game.

References

External links
 

2014 video games
Action video games
Android (operating system) games
Battletoads
Fantasy video games
Fictional knights in video games
Indie video games
Crossover video games
Kickstarter-funded video games
Crowdfunded video games
Linux games
Multiplayer and single-player video games
Nintendo 3DS eShop games
Nintendo 3DS games
Nintendo Switch games
Nintendo Network games
MacOS games
PlayStation 3 games
PlayStation 4 games
PlayStation Network games
PlayStation Vita games
Retro-style video games
 
Side-scrolling platform games
Steam Greenlight games
The Game Awards winners
Video games scored by Jake Kaufman
Video games scored by Manami Matsumae
Video games developed in the United States
Video games featuring protagonists of selectable gender
Video games that use Amiibo figurines
Wii U eShop games
Wii U games
Windows games
Xbox One games
Yacht Club Games games